Whetstone Mountain, elevation , is a summit in the Gunnison National Forest of western Colorado. Whetstone Mountain is one of several prominent laccoliths found in the West Elk Mountains.

Geology
Whetstone Mountain is a laccolith, formed  when magma intruded into sedimentary strata of Mancos Shale and the Mesaverde Formation approximately 30 million years ago. Subsequent erosion has removed the softer, overlying sedimentary rock thereby exposing the more resistant igneous rock that characterizes the mountain today. The mountain is composed of quartz monzonite porphyry and granodiorite porphyry. Whetstone Mountain was glaciated, and the most prominent glacial cirques are located on the north side of the mountain.

The mountain's name stems from rock collected in the area by the Hayden Survey during the early 1870s. Whetstones (also called hornfels) are contact metamorphic rocks useful for sharpening tools.

Historical names
Wheatstone Mountain
Whetstone Mountain – 1927

See also

List of Colorado mountain ranges
List of Colorado mountain summits
List of Colorado fourteeners
List of Colorado 4000 meter prominent summits
List of the most prominent summits of Colorado
List of Colorado county high points

References

External links

West Elk Mountains
Mountains of Gunnison County, Colorado
Mountains of Colorado
North American 3000 m summits
Laccoliths